Shorobe is a village in North-West District of Botswana. It is located close to Okavango Delta. The population was 8031 in 2011 census.
Shorobe is a sizeable village which is about 26 km north of the tourism place Maun.

Wards in Shorobe
1.Kgosing Ward
2.Letsebe Ward
3.Sephane Ward
4.Nxabe Ward
5.leretwana ward 6. Mochaba

References

North-West District (Botswana)
Villages in Botswana